is an upcoming original net animation produced by Netflix. The series is animated by Zero-G and would feature 13 episodes.

Production
The original net animation was announced by Netflix in August 2021, and is confirmed to run for 13 episodes. The series is created by Shin Kibayashi and directed by Noriaki Akitaya, with Zero-G producing the series.

References

External links

Anime with original screenplays
Netflix original anime
Shin Kibayashi
Upcoming Netflix original programming
Zero-G (studio)